William M. Robinson was a state legislator in Mississippi. He represented Hinds County, Mississippi in the Mississippi House of Representatives in 1884 and 1885.

He was born in Mississippi. He married. He lived in Raymond, Mississippi.

See also
 African-American officeholders during and following the Reconstruction era

References

African-American state legislators in Mississippi
Members of the Mississippi House of Representatives
People from Raymond, Mississippi
19th-century African-American politicians
19th-century American politicians
Year of birth missing
Year of death missing